Mount Gregory United Methodist Church is a historically black United Methodist Church located at 2325 Roxbury Mills Road in Cooksville, Maryland. The building was constructed in 1898.

See also
List of Howard County properties in the Maryland Historical Trust
Asbury Methodist Episcopal Church (Annapolis Junction, Maryland)
Brown Chapel United Methodist Church
Daisy United Methodist Church
First Baptist Church of Elkridge
Hopkins United Methodist Church
Locust United Methodist Church
Mt. Moriah Lodge No. 7
Mount Pisgah African Methodist Episcopal Church (Ellicott City, Maryland)
St. Stephens African Methodist Episcopal Church
West Liberty United Methodist Church

References

African-American history of Howard County, Maryland
Howard County, Maryland landmarks
Churches in Howard County, Maryland
Churches completed in 1898